Despite his short tenure in office, James A. Garfield appointed 5 Article III United States federal judges including 1 Justice to the Supreme Court of the United States and 1 judge to the United States circuit courts and 3 judges to the United States district courts. Garfield shared the appointment of Addison Brown with his successor, Chester A. Arthur, with Garfield placing him on the bench via a recess appointment and Arthur later nominating him to the same seat and issuing his commission.

Garfield appointed 1 judge to the United States Court of Claims, an Article I tribunal.

Supreme Court

Circuit courts

District courts

Specialty courts (Article I)

United States Court of Claims

Notes

Renominations

References

James A. Garfield
Garfield